A conservation designation is a name and/or acronym which explains the status of an area of land in terms of conservation or protection.

Examples

United Kingdom
Area of Outstanding Natural Beauty (AONB)
Environmentally sensitive area
Local nature reserve (LNR)
Marine nature reserve (MNR)
National nature reserve (NNR)
National scenic area (NSA)
Nitrate vulnerable zone (NVZ)
Site of Special Scientific Interest (SSSI)

For a comprehensive list, see Conservation in the United Kingdom

European Union
Special Area of Conservation
Special Protection Area

United States
Wildlands Project

Multi-national
Under the Berne Convention
Areas of Special Conservation Interest (ASCI)
 Ramsar site

See also
Environmental agreement

References 

Protected areas